Trichilia pseudostipularis is a species of plant in the family Meliaceae. It is endemic to Brazil.  It is threatened by habitat loss.

References

pseudostipularis
Endemic flora of Brazil
Near threatened plants
Near threatened biota of South America
Taxonomy articles created by Polbot